Elihu Katz (Hebrew: אליהוא כ"ץ, 21 May 1926 – 31 December 2021) was an American and Israeli sociologist and communication scientist, usually associated with uses and gratifications theory. He is known for his work with Paul Lazarsfeld in the field of mass communication, most notably for developing the theory of the two-step flow of communication.  He was Emeritus Professor of Communication at the Annenberg School for Communication of the University of Pennsylvania.

Katz received his bachelor's, master's, and doctorate degrees from Columbia University.

In 1989, he was awarded the prestigious Israel Prize, for social sciences.

In 2005, he received the Marshall Sklare Award, given annually by the Association for the Social Scientific Study of Jewry to a senior scholar who has made a significant scholarly contribution to the social scientific study of Jewry.

In 2013, he received an honorary degree from Northwestern University. In 2018, he received an honorary doctorate from the University of Pennsylvania. He was elected a fellow of the American Academy of Arts and Sciences in 1999.

Katz died in Jerusalem on 31 December 2021, at the age of 95.

See also 
List of Israel Prize recipients

References

External links
 Annenberg at the University of Pennsylvania - The Personal Influence of Elihu Katz

1926 births
2021 deaths
20th-century American Jews
University of Pennsylvania faculty
Academic staff of the Hebrew University of Jerusalem
American sociologists
Jewish sociologists
Israel Prize in social sciences recipients
Mass media theorists
Center for Advanced Study in the Behavioral Sciences fellows
21st-century American Jews
Scientists from New York City
Fellows of the American Academy of Arts and Sciences